Deseret Digital Media, Inc. (DDM) is a subsidiary company of Deseret Management Corporation, an American holding company owned by the Church of Jesus Christ of Latter-day Saints. DDM owns newspapers and websites, as well as radio and television stations.

Former CEO, Clark Gilbert, was named president of BYU-Idaho in early 2015. Chris Lee was the president of the company after Clark's departure. In 2016, Greg Peterson became the president of the company.

DDM was formed in 2009 to run the website operations. Its products include:
 DeseretNews.com, the website for the Deseret News newspaper
 MormonTimes.com, which supports the Deseret News newspaper's Faith section, Mormon Times
 ChurchNews.com, which supports the Deseret News newspaper's weekly supplement, Church News
 KSL.com, which supports the KSL radio stations, KSL-TV station and KSL Classifieds.
 FM100.com, the website for the KSFI radio station
 1035TheArrow.com, the website for KRSP-FM radio station

References

Further reading
 
 Deseret News – Changing Two Media Cultures | Pew Research Center's Journalism Project
Sep 10, 2009 Deseret News article on DDMs formation
 Deseret Digital Media releases Deseret News high school sports mobile website
 Salt Lake Chamber | Head of Deseret Digital Media, Deseret News discusses disruptive change

External links
 "Deseret VP: How Disruption Can Drive Digital Media Companies". Street Fight.

Publishing companies established in 2009
2009 establishments in Utah